Albanian Americans are Americans of full or partial Albanian ancestry and heritage in the United States. They trace their ancestry to the territories with a large Albanian population in the Balkans among others to Albania, Italy, Kosovo, North Macedonia and Montenegro. They are adherents of different religions and are predominantly Muslims and Christians, while some are irreligious.

In 2012, there were 203,600 American citizens of Albanian descent living in the United States, mostly in the Northeast and the Great Lakes region. In 1990, there were 47,710 Albanians. The figure includes all people affiliated with United States who claim Albanian ancestry, both those born in the country and naturalized citizens, as well as those with dual citizenship who affiliate themselves with both cultures. According to data from a 2008 survey by the United States government, there are 201,118 Americans of full or partial Albanian descent.

History

The first Albanian documented to have emigrated to the United States was Kolë Kristofori, who landed in Boston in the early 1880s and is remembered as the pioneer of the Albanian ethnic group in the U.S. It was not until the 1900s that large numbers of Albanians reached the U.S. East Coast: most of them were young bachelors from southern Albania.

The majority of this first wave of emigrants, approximately 10,000, did not intend to permanently settle in the U.S., and went back to Albania after World War I. Meanwhile, another group of emigrants from Albania reached the U.S. This new group settled and intermarried in their new country. The number of Albanians that reported the Albanian language as their mother tongue in 1920 was around 6,000.

Post-World War II 
After World War II the Albanians who emigrated to the U.S. were mostly political emigrants, and by 1970 the figure rose to around 17,000.

Following the Expulsion of Cham Albanians from Greece in the aftermath of World War II, many of them migrated to the United States, asserting that the Communist government in Albania discriminated against and persecuted them. They managed to retain their traditions and language, and created in 1973 the Chameria Human Rights Association which later merged and became Albanian American Organization Chameria which aimed to protect their rights. (see Cham Albanians).

Allowing for the families that had abandoned their mother tongue, it is estimated that around 70,000 US citizens with an Albanian background lived in the US in 1980.

In the 1990s, many Albanians from Albania, Montenegro, Serbia, and the Republic of North Macedonia emigrated to the United States as refugees of war. Another Albanian American (Kosovan-Americans) community in the Riverside/San Bernardino area of California includes Kosovans who entered the United States at the March Joint Air Reserve Base in Riverside.

Arbëreshe Americans
Some of the first ethnic Albanians to arrive in the United States were immigrants from Italy who descended from a group of Albanians known as the Arbëreshe. The Arbëreshe were a group of Albanians who fled to the Kingdom of Naples and to the Kingdom of Sicily in the 15th century to avoid invasion by the Ottoman Empire.

This group of Albanians is distinguishable from other Albanian Americans due to their Italianized names, as well as their Albanian Greek Catholic religion. Nevertheless, Arbëreshe have a strong sense of identity, and are unique in that they speak an archaic dialect of Tosk Albanian called Arbëresh, which does not have any Ottoman influence.

Greater New Orleans has a large Arbëresh community, mostly descended from 19th century Sicilian immigrants. Oftentimes, wherever there are Italians, there are a few Arbëreshe mixed with them. Arbëreshe Americans, therefore, are often indistinguishable from Italian Americans due to being assimilated into the Italian American community.

Population

Demographics
According to the American Community Survey (ACS) for 2012 the number of Albanians in the USA had grown to 214,300. The ethnic Albanian population in the US is highly concentrated in few places. With over 60,000 Albanian-Americans, the largest community is in New York which dominates as a center of the Albanian community. There is a sizeable Albanian community around the Bronx, especially around Belmont and Bedford Park as well as parts of Westchester County such as Yonkers. Some 43,400 live in Michigan, about 21,300 live in Massachusetts, approximately 20,000 live in Ohio (in Greater Cleveland, especially Lakewood and the West Side of Cleveland), 15,300 live in Illinois and about 12,000 live in Connecticut. The three largest communities (New York, Michigan and Massachusetts) account for 58% of the total Albanian-American population.

Albanian-Americans are on average younger than non-Albanian Americans, having an average age of 33.5 in comparison to the American national average of 37.7. Albanian-Americans also have a higher percentage of males than non-Albanian Americans with 52.1% of the community being male versus the American national average of 49.2%. 

According to the 2000 Census, Fairview, North Carolina has the highest percentage of people stating they have Albanian Ancestry followed by Hamtramck, Michigan at 2.8%.

Albanian-born population
Albanian-born population in the U.S. since 2010: (excludes Albanians born in Kosovo, North Macedonia, Montenegro)

Notable people 

Selected people:

See also 
 European Americans
 Albanian diaspora
 Albania-United States relations
 Albanian American Student Organization
 History of the Albanian Americans in Metro Detroit
 History of Albanians in Maine

References

Further reading
 Federal Writers' Project, Works Project Administration (WPA) of Massachusetts. The Albanian Struggle in the Old World and New (1939).
 Fischer, Bernd J. “Albanian Refugees Seeking Political Asylum in the United States: Process and Problems.” Journal of Ethnic and Migration Studies 31#1 (2005): 193–208.
 Jurgens, Jane. "Albanian Americans." in Gale Encyclopedia of Multicultural America, edited by Thomas Riggs, (3rd ed., vol. 1, Gale, 2014), pp. 61–73. Online
 Ragaru, Nadège, and Amilda Dymi. “The Albanian-American Community in the United States: A Diaspora Coming to Visibility.” Canadian Review of Studies in Nationalism 31, nos. 1–2 (2004): 45–63.
 Thernstrom, Stephan; Orlov, Ann; Handlin, Oscar, eds. Harvard Encyclopedia of American Ethnic Groups, Harvard University Press, pp 23–28 Online free to borrow
 Trix, Frances. The Albanians in Michigan: A Proud People from Southeast Europe (Michigan State University Press, 2001).

Websites 

 
 

 
European-American society
Albanian diaspora by country
Ethnic groups in the United States